The first world record in the men's high jump was recognised by the International Association of Athletics Federations (IAAF) in 1912.

As of June, 2009, the IAAF has ratified 40 world records in the event.

Fourteen of the 16 records from 1912 to 1960 were set in the United States and were originally measured in feet and inches; they were converted to metric before being ratified as world records. As of January 1, 1963, records were accepted as metric marks, with marks measured in feet and inches to the nearest quarter-inch and rounded down to the nearest centimetre. When measurements were taken in feet and inches the bar could be raised, for record-attempt purposes, in increments of one-quarter inch. Under the metric system, a new record must be (at least) one centimeter higher. In 1973, American Dwight Stones was the first Fosbury Flop jumper to set a world record. The namesake of the technique, Dick Fosbury impressed the world by winning the 1968 Olympics with the flop, but never held the world record.  The last Straddle style jumper to hold the World Record was Vladimir Yashchenko (Soviet Union/Ukraine) in 1978; all record-setters since then have used the Flop technique.

Progression

See also
 Women's high jump world record progression
 List of Olympic medalists in athletics (men)
 Men's high jump Italian record progression

Notes

References

High jump world record progression International Olympic Committee

High jump, men
High jump
Articles which contain graphical timelines
World record high jump
High jump outdoor